Carter County is the name of five counties in the United States:

 Carter County, Kentucky 
 Carter County, Missouri 
 Carter County, Montana 
 Carter County, Oklahoma 
 Carter County, Tennessee

See also
 Carter Country, a TV series (1977-1979)